Michael Spiby is an Australian musician and a founding member of The Badloves. He released his debut single "(All my Love) Ella" in 1999 and solo album, Ho’s Kitchen, in 2000 and it was nominated for the 2000 ARIA Award for Best Adult Contemporary Album.

Discography

Albums

Awards and nominations

|-
| 2000
| Ho's Kitchen
| ARIA Award for Best Adult Contemporary Album
| 
|-

References

External links
the official website om Michael Spiby

Australian male singers
Living people
Year of birth missing (living people)